Output Recordings was a British independent record label run by Trevor Jackson, between 1996 and 2006. Output released 100 records over the ten-year period, and several bands first appeared on this label, including Fridge, Lisa Germano, Four Tet, Black Strobe, Colder, LCD Soundsystem, and Jackson's own Playgroup.

Output Recordings also co-distributed releases from DFA Records in Europe.

References

External links
Official webpage with catalog of unavailable releases
Output Recordings on MySpace with streaming music
Trevor Jackson on MySpace, with history of label

British independent record labels
Record labels established in 1996